Yasyn Khamid (born 10 January 1993 in Kharkiv, Ukraine) is a professional Ukrainian football striker of Egyptian descent who last played for Zira FK in the Azerbaijan Premier League.

Khamid is product of youth team systems of UFK Kharkiv. He spent 6 years played for FC Metalurh Donetsk Reserves and Youth Team and went on loan in the Ukrainian First League club FC Stal Alchevsk. He made his debut for FC Stal entering as a second-half substitute against FC Zirka Kirovohrad on 26 July 2014 in Ukrainian First League.

References

External links
 
 

1993 births
Living people
Footballers from Kharkiv
Ukrainian footballers
FC Metalurh Donetsk players
FC Stal Alchevsk players
FC Kharkiv players
Ukrainian expatriate footballers
Ukrainian people of Egyptian descent
Expatriate footballers in Azerbaijan
Ukrainian expatriate sportspeople in Azerbaijan
AZAL PFK players
Ravan Baku FC players
Zira FK players

Association football forwards
Kharkiv State College of Physical Culture 1 alumni